"I Am Become Death" is the fourth episode of the third season of the NBC superhero drama series Heroes and thirty-eighth episode overall. It was written by Aron Eli Coleite and directed by David Von Ancken. The episode aired on October 6, 2008. The title is a reference to a phrase from the Bhagavad Gita and was famously quoted by J. Robert Oppenheimer; "Now I am become Death, the destroyer of worlds."

Plot
Peter travels four years into the future with his future self, where they discover Kaito's formula is being used to administer adrenal power enhancements to ordinary people, some of whom are unable or unwilling to control their abilities. Future Peter tells Present Peter that Sylar can help to fix the problematic future. The Claire of this future assassinates Future Peter.

Peter finds that a friendly Sylar has reassumed his former identity of Gabriel Gray, and is now raising his young son, Noah, in Claire's former home. Gabriel reluctantly teaches Peter his power, warning him that the power comes with an uncontrollable hunger. Future Claire, Knox and Daphne show up to kill Peter. Gabriel beats Knox into submission and loses control of his radiation ability after his toddler son is killed during the fight.  Peter tries in vain to stop Gabriel before he explodes, reducing Costa Verde to nuclear waste. Claire takes Peter back to the base.

In this future time, Matt is married to Daphne and raising a baby girl, along with Molly. Daphne is the unknown woman Matt has been seeing in the paintings on his spirit quest in Africa. Daphne is mortally injured from Sylar's nuclear fallout but makes her way back to her family to die. 

Nathan, who in this future is the President and married to Tracy, offers Peter the opportunity to read his mind to see if he's sincere. Peter stops short of cutting Nathan's head open and teleports back to the present Level 5, where Sylar confirms that he is Peter's brother.

In the present, Tracy attempts to commit suicide by jumping off a bridge. Nathan flies in and saves her.

Throughout the episode, Mohinder is researching a possible cure for the powers he's given himself.

Hiro and Ando finally resolve their differences. They try to escape through a vent and are caught by the Haitian. Angela Petrelli mentions that Hiro's father would have been disappointed with him for losing both portions of the formula and mentions that he already has "the key" to restoring the formula. The scene switches to Hiro and Ando in a graveyard, digging up Adam Monroe who, upon seeing Hiro, lunges at him.

Reception
The episode was given a score of D+ by The A.V. Club reviewer Noel Murray.

Robert Canning of IGN gave the episode 7.6 out of 10.

References

External links

Heroes (season 3) episodes
2008 American television episodes
Television episodes about time travel
Fiction set in 2012